Leandro Parreças Ramos (born 21 September 2000) is a Portuguese athlete specialising in the Javelin throw. He won a silver medal at the 2021 European U23 Championships.

His personal best in the event is 84.78 metres set in Doha in 2022. This is the current national record.

International competitions

References

2000 births
Living people
Portuguese male javelin throwers
21st-century Portuguese people
Mediterranean Games gold medalists in athletics
Athletes (track and field) at the 2022 Mediterranean Games
Mediterranean Games gold medalists for Portugal
World Athletics Championships athletes for Portugal